The 2014 Red Bull Frozen Rush was the inaugural Frozen Rush event. The event was held on January 9 - 10, 2014 at Sunday River Ski Resort near Newry, Maine. All competitors competed in four-wheel drive purpose built Trophy Trucks.

Qualifying

Race

References

External links
 

Red Bull Frozen Rush
Red Bull Frozen Rush
Red Bull Frozen Rush
2014 in sports in Maine
Sports competitions in Maine
Newry, Maine